Kaija is a contemporary feminine personal name thought to have arisen as a Finnic variant of the Katrin, or alternatively from Katariina.

Among the people who share this name are:
 Kaija Aarikka (1929-2014), Finnish designer
 Kaija Juurikkala (b. 1959), a Finnish film director and screenwriter
 Kaija Kärkinen (b. 1962), a Finnish singer and actress
 Kaija Koo (b. 1962 as Kaija Kokkola), a Finnish singer
 Kaija Lustila (b. 1965), a Finnish singer
 Kaija Mustonen (b. 1941), a Finnish skater
 Kaija Pohjola (b. 1951), a Finnish singer
 Kaija Saariaho née Laakkonen (b. 1952), a Finnish composer
 Kaija Salopuro (b. 1938), Finnish footballer
 Kaija Silvennoinen (b. 1954), a Finnish skier
 Kaija Siren née Tuominen (1920–2001), a Finnish architect
 Kaija Udras (b. 1986), an Estonian skier

Notes

General references
 

Uralic personal names
Estonian feminine given names
Finnish feminine given names